Enfield was a constituency for the House of Commons of the UK Parliament from 1885 until 1950.  The area sloping to the River Lea in the east was in the far north of Middlesex centred on the town of Enfield. The area formed part of the London conurbation and was much reduced over the course of its existence, in 1918 and then insignificantly in 1945 due to suburbanisation and urbanisation.  It returned one Member of Parliament (MP).

History
The constituency was created by the Redistribution of Seats Act 1885 for the 1885 general election, and abolished for the 1950 general election.  It was then replaced by the new Enfield East and Enfield West constituencies.

Boundaries
1885–1918: The parishes of Edmonton, Enfield, Friern Barnet, Monken Hadley, and South Mimms.  These reflected ancient parishes and the smallest in the non-metropolitan county, Monken Hadley was a small rectangle in the south-centre of the seat.  Friern Barnet formed a projection in the south-west running north-west reflecting the eccentric shape of this part of the county border.  The latter adjoined Barnet in Hertfordshire as much of the rest did and joined the parishes of Hornsey and Finchley to the south.

1918–1950: The Urban District of Enfield, and the Rural District of South Mimms. The Representation of the People Act 1918 redrew constituencies throughout Great Britain and Ireland, and defined them in terms of the new urban and rural districts introduced by the Local Government Act 1894. Of the areas transferred to other constituencies in this redistribution, Edmonton became a separate constituency, while Friern Barnet was transferred to the new Finchley seat. A "Wood Green" seat was devised which took the Southgate southern parts of Enfield and western extreme of Edmonton parish.

 Renamed as Potters Bar Urban District in 1934.

Members of Parliament

Elections

Elections in the 1880s 

Pleydell-Bouverie was appointed Treasurer of the Household, requiring a by-election.

Pleydell-Bouverie was elevated to the peerage, becoming Earl of Radnor, causing a by-election.

Elections in the 1890s

Elections in the 1900s

Elections in the 1910s 

General Election 1914–15:

Another General Election was required to take place before the end of 1915. The political parties had been making preparations for an election to take place and by July 1914, the following candidates had been selected; 
Unionist: John Pretyman Newman
Liberal: John McEwan

Elections in the 1920s

Elections in the 1930s 

General Election 1939–40

Another General Election was required to take place before the end of 1940. The political parties had been making preparations for an election to take place and by the Autumn of 1939, the following candidates had been selected; 
Conservative: Bartle Bull
Labour: Ernest Davies

Elections in the 1940s

References

Enfield, London
Parliamentary constituencies in London (historic)
Constituencies of the Parliament of the United Kingdom established in 1885
Constituencies of the Parliament of the United Kingdom disestablished in 1950
London Borough of Enfield